Wuxi is a town and the county seat of Luxi in Hunan, China. The town is located in the northeast of the county, it is bordered by Xixi Town (洗溪镇) to the west and northwest, Yuanling County to the northeast, Chenxi County to the southeast, Pushi Town (浦市镇) to the south.

References

Luxi, Hunan
County seats in Hunan
Towns of Hunan